The following list is a discography of production by Shizzi, a Nigeria record producer from Lagos State.

Singles produced

Other production

References 

Albums produced by Shizzi
Discographies of Nigerian artists